General Sir George Leslie Conroy Cooper,  (10 August 1925 – 6 January 2020) was a senior British Army officer who served as Adjutant-General to the Forces from 1981 to 1984.

Military career
Educated at Downside School and Trinity College, Cambridge, George Cooper was commissioned into the Royal Engineers in 1945. He joined the Bengal Sappers & Miners. He served in the Korean War and was awarded the Military Cross for his service in that campaign.

Cooper became Commander Royal Engineers in the 4th Infantry Division in 1966. He went on to become Commander, 19th Airportable Brigade in 1969, General Officer Commanding South West District in 1974 and Director of Army Staff Duties in 1976. After that he became General Officer Commanding South East District in 1979. He became Adjutant General in 1981, before retiring in 1984.

Cooper was appointed ADC General to the Queen in 1982, retaining that status until 1984. He was also appointed a Knight Commander of the Order of the Bath in 1979, and a Knight Grand Cross of the Order of the Bath in 1984.

Later life and death
In retirement, Cooper became a member of the Board of Management of GEC UK. He also became a Deputy Lieutenant of Essex, and released the book Fight, Dig and Live about the part the Royal Engineers played in the Korean War.

He died in January 2020 at the age of 94.

Family
In 1957 Cooper married Cynthia Mary Hume and they had one son and one daughter.

References

 

|-
 

|-
 

1925 births
2020 deaths
People educated at Downside School
Alumni of Trinity College, Cambridge
British Army generals
Knights Grand Cross of the Order of the Bath
Bengal Engineers officers
Deputy Lieutenants of Essex
Recipients of the Military Cross
British Army personnel of the Korean War
Military personnel from London